Barqusya (also: Barkusya) was a Palestinian Arab village in the Hebron Subdistrict, depopulated  in the 1948 Palestine War. It was located 31 km northwest of Hebron.

History
In 1838,  in the Ottoman era,   Berkusia  was noted as Muslim village in the Gaza area, and being "somewhat larger" than Bil'in.

In 1863,  Victor Guérin found the village to have about 150 inhabitants. He further noted that it was situated on a low hill, with fig trees to the north. 

An official Ottoman village list of about 1870 showed that Berkusja had 28 houses and a population of 72, though the population count included men, only. 

In 1882 the PEF's Survey of Western Palestine (SWP) described it:  "A village of moderate size, on a hill in a conspicuous position. The houses are of mud and stone. There is a fine well, resembling that of Summeil, west of the village, and rock-cut tombs to the south-west." 

In 1896 the population of  Berkusja was estimated to be about 171 persons.

British Mandate era
In the 1922 census of Palestine conducted by the British Mandate authorities, Barqusya had a population of 198 inhabitants, all Muslims, increasing in the  1931 census   258 inhabitants, in 53 houses. 

In the 1945 statistics, it had  a population of 330 Muslim inhabitants, and a land area of 3216 dunams.   Of this, 28 dunams were for plantations and irrigable land,  2460 dunams were for cereals, while 31 dunams were built-up (urban) land.

1948 and aftermath
It was depopulated during the 1948 Arab-Israeli War on July 9, 1948, as part of Operation An-Far.

In 1992 the village site was described: "No houses remain. Some graves can be seen amidst foxtail and khubbayza (mallow) plants. One of the graves has an inscribed tombstone resting on the superstructure. There are also the remnants of a well. Cactuses and a variety of trees, including palms grow on the site. The site serves as grazing grounds for Israeli farmers who also grow grapes and the fruits."

References

Bibliography

External links
Welcome To Barqusya
Barqusya, Zochrot
Survey of Western Palestine, Map 16: IAA,  Wikimedia commons
Barqusya, from the Khalil Sakakini Cultural Center

Arab villages depopulated during the 1948 Arab–Israeli War
District of Hebron